Bloléquin Department is a department of Cavally Region in Montagnes District, Ivory Coast. In 2021, its population was 237,944 and its seat is the settlement of Bloléquin. The sub-prefectures of the department are Bloléquin, Diboké, Doké, Tinhou, and Zéaglo.

History
Bloléquin Department was created in 2005 as a second-level subdivision via a split-off from Guiglo Department. At its creation, it was part of Moyen-Cavally Region.

In 2011, districts were introduced as new first-level subdivisions of Ivory Coast. At the same time, regions were reorganised and became second-level subdivisions and all departments were converted into third-level subdivisions. At this time, Bloléquin Department became part of Cavally Region in Montagnes District.

Notes

References
"Monographie : Bloléquin, un département d’énormes potentialités à valoriser", abidjan.net, 19 November 2014

Departments of Cavally Region
2005 establishments in Ivory Coast
States and territories established in 2005